George Duncan may refer to:

George Duncan (biblical scholar) (1884–1965), Scottish New Testament scholar and church Moderator
George Duncan (golfer)  (1883–1964), Scottish golfer
George Duncan (painter) (1904–1974), Australian artist
George Duncan (politician) (1791–1878), Scottish member of parliament
George Alexander Duncan (1902–2006), Irish economist and academic
George B. Duncan (1861–1950), officer in the United States Army
George Baillie Duncan (1912–1997), preacher and Keswick Convention speaker
George Smith Duncan (1852–1930), tramway and mining engineer
Dr George Duncan (1930–1972), law lecturer, whose murder led to decriminalization of homosexuality in South Australia
George Duncan (footballer) (1937–2012), Scottish footballer

See also

George Duncan Beechey (1798–1852), portrait painter
George Duncan Ludlow (1734–1808), lawyer